Stuart Little is a 1999 American live action/computer-animated comedy film loosely based on the 1945 novel of the same name by E. B. White. Directed by Rob Minkoff in his live-action debut, the screenplay was written by M. Night Shyamalan and Greg Brooker, and stars Geena Davis, Hugh Laurie and Jonathan Lipnicki, alongside the voices of Michael J. Fox, Nathan Lane, Chazz Palminteri, Steve Zahn, Bruno Kirby and Jennifer Tilly.

Stuart Little premiered in Westwood at Mann Village Theatre on December 5, 1999, and was released in United States on December 17, 1999, by Columbia Pictures. The film received generally positive reviews, and was nominated for an Academy Award for Best Visual Effects, losing to The Matrix.  After its success, it also started a franchise, spawning the sequel Stuart Little 2 in 2002, the short-lived television series Stuart Little in 2003, and another sequel in 2005, the direct-to-video Stuart Little 3: Call of the Wild. It was Estelle Getty's final film role.

Plot
Frederick and Eleanor Little are a happily married couple living in New York City, intending to adopt a younger brother for their son, George. When they visit the orphanage, they meet a young anthropomorphic mouse named Stuart and, despite the head of the orphanage Mrs. Keeper's initial objections, choose him instead. Upon returning home, Stuart struggles to fit in; George is disappointed and refuses to acknowledge Stuart as his brother, and the family cat, Snowbell, is disgusted at the fact that he is now a pet to a mouse. Eleanor then goes on to accidentally trap Stuart in the washing machine one morning after a load of laundry. She rescues Stuart from swallowing too much detergent, but Stuart becomes ill as he coughs up soap bubbles. Stuart then recovers after a visit from Dr. Beechwood.

After Stuart admits to the Littles that he feels an empty space inside him, they meet with Mrs. Keeper to find out some information about Stuart's real parents, but are told nothing due to confidentiality. As time goes by, George and Stuart start to bond after Stuart encourages him to finish making his model boat for an upcoming race. Meanwhile, Snowbell and his friend Monty host a meeting with a rogue alley cat named Smokey and hatch a plan to have Stuart removed from the household.

On the day of the race, Stuart accidentally breaks George's remote control, rendering his boat inoperable. He jumps in and takes control of it himself, narrowly avoiding a crash on the water and subsequently winning the race. Later that night while celebrating, they are interrupted by a mouse couple who arrive at the house; they introduce themselves as Reggie and Camille Stout, and claim to be Stuart's biological parents who were forced to give him up due to poverty. The Littles reluctantly agree to allow Stuart to leave with the Stouts, leaving George forlorn.

The orphanage contacts the Littles to ask how Stuart is doing, and when Frederick and Eleanor explain he has gone home with his real parents, Mrs. Keeper informs them that Stuart's real parents died several years earlier when a canned food pyramid fell on them in a supermarket, hence why he was put up for adoption to begin with. Realizing Stuart has been kidnapped (a ploy organized by Snowbell and the other cats), the family organize a huge search party around the city. Fearing that his involvement in the deception will be exposed, Snowbell informs Smokey that the Littles have found out about the Stouts, so Smokey decides Stuart must be killed instead.

Filled with remorse due to Stuart's overwhelming sadness, Reggie and Camille tell him the truth and order him to run away for his own safety; he is delighted to hear he is not a Stout and makes his way back to the Little house. On the way through the park, he is ambushed by Smokey and his gang but manages to evade them by going into a sewer. He makes it home, greeted by a jealous Snowbell who tells him the family are out celebrating his absence. Heartbroken, Stuart leaves. In Central Park, he stops to rest for the night in a birds' nest, and is later found by a remorseful Snowbell, who admits he lied and encourages him to come home. When the pair are confronted by the other cats, Snowbell refuses to hand Stuart over and the cats give chase. They eventually corner Stuart as he hangs from a tree branch over a pond of cold water; Snowbell saves him by breaking the branch the cats are on, sending Monty and the others plummeting into the pond below, which they quickly swim out of. Smokey sneaks up behind Snowbell to kill him but before he can do so, Stuart intervenes by releasing a thin branch that hits Smokey in the face, which also sends him plunging into the pond. Smokey swims and climbs out of the pond, furious and humiliated at being defeated by a "mouse and his pet cat", and wonders what could be worse. His question is answered when he is suddenly attacked by two stray dogs, who presumably kill him.

Snowbell takes Stuart home, just as the Littles are getting ready for bed. George spots Stuart through the front window and everyone is happily reunited. When Frederick asks how he made it back, he tells them he owes his life to Snowbell, who has finally realized Stuart truly is family.

Cast

Live-action cast

Geena Davis as Mrs. Eleanor Little, the mother of the Little family and Frederick's wife.
Hugh Laurie as Mr. Frederick Little, the father of the Little family and Eleanor's husband.
Jonathan Lipnicki as George Little, the eldest son of the Little family and Stuart's older brother.
Jeffrey Jones as Uncle Crenshaw Little, the older brother of Frederick Little and the younger brother of Beatrice.
Connie Ray as Aunt Tina Little, the wife of Crenshaw and the sister-in-law of Beatrice and Frederick.
Allyce Beasley as Aunt Beatrice Little, the older sister of Crenshaw and Frederick.
Brian Doyle-Murray as Cousin Edgar Little, the cousin of Beatrice, Crenshaw and Frederick and the nephew of Grandpa Spencer.
Estelle Getty as Grandma Estelle Little, the mother of Beatrice, Crenshaw and Frederick.
Harold Gould as Grandpa Spencer Little, the father of Beatrice, Crenshaw and Frederick.
Patrick Thomas O'Brien as Uncle Stretch Little, the husband of Beatrice and the brother-in-law of Crenshaw and Frederick.
Julia Sweeney as Mrs. Keeper, the head of the New York City Public Orphanage.
Dabney Coleman as Dr. Beechwood, a doctor who came to the Littles' house.
 Miles Marsico as Anton Gartman, a mean-spirited child who bullied George during the boat race.
Jim Doughan as Detective Phil Allen, Detective Sherman's partner. Doughan also voiced Lucky the Cat in the film.
Jon Polito as Detective Sherman, a police detective who works for the New York Police Department.
Joe Bays as the Race Starter
Taylor Negron as the Clothing Salesman

Voice cast
Michael J. Fox as Stuart Little, a young anthropomorphic mouse who is adopted as the middle child of the Little family.
Nathan Lane as Snowbell, the Little family's Persian cat who initially dislikes Stuart.
Chazz Palminteri as Smokey, a sadistic and intelligent Russian Blue cat with a mafia-like personality who is the leader of a gang of Mafia-like alley cats and came up with a plan to kill Stuart when Snowbell and Monty summoned him.
Steve Zahn as Monty, a gray tabby cat, Snowbell's best friend and a former member of the alley cats.
Jim Doughan as Lucky, a Siamese cat and a member of Smokey's gang. Doughan also played Detective Allen in the film.
David Alan Grier as Red, a ginger American Shorthair tomcat and a member of Smokey's gang.
Bruno Kirby as Mr. Reginald Stout, Camille's husband and Stuart's fake father.
Jennifer Tilly as Mrs. Camille Stout, Reginald's wife and Stuart's fake mother.
Stan Freberg as the Race Announcer

Production
Filming began on August 3, 1998, and wrapped on November 11.

Lost painting unknowingly used on set
One of the paintings used as set dressing for the Littles' home was Hungarian avant garde painter Róbert Berény's 1920s painting Sleeping Lady with Black Vase, which had long been considered lost. A set designer for the film had purchased the painting at an antiques store in Pasadena, California for $500 for use in the film, unaware of its significance. In 2009, art historian Gergely Barki, while watching Stuart Little on television with his daughter, noticed the painting, and after contacting the studios was able to track down its whereabouts. In 2014, its owner sold the painting at an auction for €229,500.

Reception

Box office
Stuart Little was released theatrically on December 17, 1999. On its opening weekend, Stuart Little grossed $15 million, placing it at #1 dethroning Toy Story 2. It dropped to #2 over its second weekend, but went back to #1 on its third weekend with $16 million. According to Box Office Mojo, its final gross in the United States and Canada was $140 million and it grossed $160.1 million at the international box office, for an estimated total of $300 million worldwide.

Critical reception
On Rotten Tomatoes, 67% of critics gave the film a positive review based on 97 responses with an average rating of 6.4/10. The site's consensus reads: "Critics say Stuart Little is charming with kids and adults for its humor and visual effects." On Metacritic, the film has a score of 61 out of 100 from 32 reviews, indicating "generally favorable" reviews. Audiences polled by CinemaScore gave the film an average grade of "A-" on an A+ to F scale.

Jesus Freak Hideout said that "from start to finish, Stuart Little is a near flawless family film" while Stephen Holden of The New York Times had said "the only element that doesn't completely harmonize with the rest of the film is the visually unremarkable digital figure of Stuart."

Home media
Stuart Little was released on VHS and DVD in the United States on April 18, 2000 by Columbia TriStar Home Video, and in the United Kingdom on November 27, 2000. It was later re-released on a Deluxe Edition on May 21, 2002, by Columbia TriStar Home Entertainment. Stuart Little and Stuart Little 2 were released in a combo on Sony PSP's UMD format on January 3, 2006 and Blu-ray on June 28, 2011, by Sony Pictures Home Entertainment.

Soundtrack
The soundtrack album Stuart Little: Music from and Inspired by the Motion Picture was released by Motown and Universal Records on November 30, 1999, on audio CD and audio cassette. Tracks in bold do not appear in the film.

References

External links

 

Stuart Little (franchise)
1990s adventure comedy films
1990s children's adventure films
1990s children's comedy films
1990s children's fantasy films
1990s fantasy comedy films
1999 comedy films
1999 films
American adventure comedy films
American children's adventure films
American children's comedy films
American children's fantasy films
American fantasy adventure films
American fantasy comedy films
American films with live action and animation
Animated films about mice
Columbia Pictures films
Films about adoption
Films about cats
Films about child abduction in the United States
Films about orphans
Films adapted into television shows
Films based on American novels
Films based on children's books
Films based on novels by E. B. White
Films directed by Rob Minkoff
Films produced by Douglas Wick
Films scored by Alan Silvestri
Films set in New York City
Films shot in Los Angeles County, California
Films shot in New York City
Films with screenplays by M. Night Shyamalan
Motown soundtracks
1990s English-language films
1990s American films